Yanis Hamache (born 13 July 1999) is an Algerian professional footballer who plays as a left-back for Ukrainian club Dnipro-1 and the Algeria national team.

Career
A youth product of Nice, Hamache joined Red Star on loan for the 2019–20 season in the Championnat National. On 31 July 2020, Hamache signed a professional contract with Boavista for three years. Hamache made his professional debut with Boavista in a 1-0 Primeira Liga loss to Vitória S.C. on 19 October 2020.

International career
Born in France, Hamache is of Algerian descent. He was called up to the Algeria national team in May 2022. He debuted with Algeria in a 2–1 friendly win over Iran on 7 June 2022.

References

External links
 

1999 births
Living people
Footballers from Marseille
Algerian footballers
Algeria international footballers
French footballers
French sportspeople of Algerian descent
Association football fullbacks
Boavista F.C. players
Red Star F.C. players
SC Dnipro-1 players
Primeira Liga players
Championnat National players
Algerian expatriate footballers
French expatriate footballers
Expatriate footballers in Portugal